Aleksandr Nevskiy (born 21 February 1958) is a retired male decathlete from the Soviet Union.  He set his personal best (8476 points) when finishing as runner-up at the annual Hypo-Meeting in Götzis on 20 May 1984.  He took part in the World Championships in Athletics on two occasions, with his best result of sixth place coming at the inaugural event in 1983.

Achievements

References
trackfield.brinkster

See also
Men's heptathlon world record progression

1958 births
Living people
Soviet decathletes